The Davy, Bessemer, Beaufort, Brown and Boyle gas fields are natural gas reservoirs and gas production facilities in two locations in the southern North Sea. The fields produced natural gas from 1995.

History 
The Davy gas field was discovered as early as 1970 but there was limited local infrastructure to transport gas to shore. The Bessemer and Beaufort fields were discovered in 1989 and 1991 by wells 49/23-5 and 49/23-7 respectively. The improved production technology in the late 1980s made the development of the fields viable. Technology included horizontal wells and minimum topsides facilities. Gas from the fields was routed to Indefatigable 49/23AT for compression.

The gas fields 
The Davy, Bessemer, Beaufort, Brown and Boyle gas fields are located in the UK Offshore Blocks 49/30 and 53/05. The fields were initially developed by Amoco, which merged with BP in 1998. Perenco assumed ownership in 2003 and were responsible for later developments. The fields are named after British and Irish scientists, engineers and inventors: namely Humphry Davy, Henry Bessemer, Francis Beaufort, Charles Brown and Robert Boyle.

The characteristics of the gas reservoirs and the production facilities are summarised in the table.

Gas production 
Bessemer also receives gas from the N.W, Bell wellhead (49/23) via a 9.45 km, 6-inch pipeline.

The Davy and Bessemer installations export gas to the Indefatigable 49/23AT platform which has reception facilities for the 16-inch pipelines from Davy and Bessemer. After processing the gas is routed, along with Inde gas, to the Bacton gas terminal.

The gas production profile, in mcm/y, for Davy is as shown.

The gas production profile, in mcm/y, for Bessemer is as shown.

Production from Davy North and Beaufort has ceased.

See also 

 Indefatigable gas field
 Bacton gas terminal 
 List of oil and gas fields of the North Sea

References 

Natural gas fields in the United Kingdom
North Sea energy